Allera is a surname. Notable people with the surname include:

Francis Allera (born 1985), Filipino basketball player
Marc Allera (born 1972), CEO of EE Limited